Gábor Kovács (born 2 January 1957, in Orosháza) is a Hungarian financier, banker, art collector, philanthropist and founder of KOGART.

Life and career 
Having studied at the Moscow State Institution for International Relations (MGIMO) between 1975 and 1980, he started his career at the Hungarian National Bank. He was the first managing director of Citibank Budapest from 1985, before becoming the vice-president of Citibank London. Back in Hungary by 1991, he founded Bankár Holding Plc., which he now heads as president and CEO. It was at this time that he began to collect works by, as well as to support, Hungarian artists. His collection spans the history of Hungarian painting from the early 18th to the mid-20th century.

On 8 November 2003, he established the Gábor Kovács Art Foundation with a HUF 3 bn capital stock, and opened KOGART House on 20 April 2004.

He has been a member of the Trilateral Commission since 2006.

Following its full-scale renovation, he reopened, with a new function, the Pauline-Carmelite Monastery of Sopronbánfalva in 2010, which was managed and owned by him till 2015.

Above all, he is interested in finding answers for the new social and economic challenges of the 21st century.

Milestones of his career 
 1980–1985 Hungarian National Bank, Foreign Exchange Controls Department, International Section, Scandinavian officer,
 1985–1989 Citibank Rt. (Budapest), managing director,
 1989–1991 Citibank (London), vice-president,
 1991– Bankár Ltd. (Budapest), managing director, later Bankár Holding Plc., president-CEO.

Beauty—Harmony—Equilibrium

Awards and distinctions 
2005: Summa Artium Award, “For Contemporary Art” category, for his extensive work as an organizer and supporter of art.
2005: Knight’s Cross of the Order of Merit of the Republic of Hungary

References

Sources 
 Biográf Ki Kicsoda (Hungarian Who is Who). Budapest, 2002.

External links 
 About the founder
 Masterpieces of Hungarian Painting Art from the Selection of Gábor Kovács
 Monastery History 2004, 2009-2010
 Gábor Kovács Art Collection

Hungarian businesspeople
Hungarian art collectors
Hungarian philanthropists
1957 births
Living people
Knight's Crosses of the Order of Merit of the Republic of Hungary (civil)